VCDHD (Versatile Compact Disc High Density) is an optical disc standard, similar to CD or DVD. The technology for VCDHD was invented with in: Japan, the Netherlands and Poland. Since the name of the technology is similar to the arbitrarily inferior VCD, it's also marketed using the name DVHD (Disc Versatile High Density).

The capacity of a VCDHD is 4.7 GB, the same as an average single-layer DVD. According to the official site, the tests at Philips laboratories have proven the discs to be fully compatible with modern DVD players. With use of blue laser technology steadily becoming available now, the capacity may be increased by up to 15 GB.

The format's main advantages include:
 a better resistance to scratching in comparison to DVDs
 a thickness of 0.6 mm (compared to 1.2 mm of a DVD)
 extreme elasticity and the resulting resistance to bending
 low manufacturing and production costs and time (approximately 2 seconds for a VCDHD, compared to a DVD which is approximately three times that amount)
 production defect levels are only about 1%
 the format does not require a DVD license to manufacture
 It works correctly on most DVD drives

Most popular in: Russia, Ukraine and Poland.

External links
Blu-ray and HD-DVD Alternative; VCDHD DailyTech
New optical disc joins the fray engadget

Rotating disc computer storage media
DVD
Optical disc authoring
Elasticity (physics)